Getchell is a surname. Notable people with the surname include:

E. Duncan Getchell (born 1949), American lawyer
Mike Getchell, retired American soccer midfielder
Robert Getchell (born 1936), American screenwriter
Sumner Getchell (1906–1990), American film actor
William H. Getchell (1829–1910), photographer in 19th-century Boston, Massachusetts

See also
Getchell, Washington
Getchell Mine, underground gold mine owned by both Barrick Gold, and Newmont Mining, near Winnemucca, Nevada
Getchell Township, Barnes County, North Dakota
Marysville Getchell High School, public high school in Marysville, Washington, USA